Unnale Unnale is a 2007 Indian Tamil-language romantic musical film.The movie is directed and co-written by Jeeva and produced by Oscar Ravichandran. It stars Vinay, Sadha and Tanisha Mukherjee in lead roles; Srinath, Raju Sundaram and Sathish Krishnan in supporting roles; and Lekha Washington, Aravind Akash, Uma Padmanabhan, and Vasundhara Kashyap in cameo roles. Raju Sundaram also worked as a choreographer in the film. The Telugu dubbed version was titled Neevalle Neevalle and released simultaneously with the Tamil version.

The film revolves around the aftermath of a relationship between a careless man and a serious woman. Despite being in a relationship, the latter walks out on the former due to his antics with other women. However, the man changes his ways and on a business trip to Melbourne, he encounters another woman. This other woman's boss turns out to be the man's former lover. The events that follow and who the man eventually gets together with form the crux of the story.

The film opened to Indian audiences after several delays, on 14 April 2007, coinciding with the Tamil New Year. The film received positive reviews and became a blockbuster hit at  box office. It marked the last directorial venture of Jeeva before his death on 26 June 2007.

Plot 
The film opens with a man (Aravind Akash) and woman interviewing civilians on love and the opposite sex. After a mixture of answers, they cease their questions, and the credits roll. The credits end as a boy, after being rejected by his girlfriend, is accidentally hit by a passing car and dies. Karthik (Vinay) walks off, disturbed, to his girlfriend Jhansi's (Sadha) office. There, he is criticized by her for his antics with other women and his lack of passion for their love. She walks off, ending their relationship.

Karthik is then shown as a civil engineer in Chennai, still playful and fun-loving. Accepting a request from his manager to go on a six-month business trip to Melbourne, he bids farewell to his friends Raju (Raju Sundaram) and Sathish (Sathish Krishnan). On the plane, he encounters a playful, flirtatious girl named Deepika (Tanisha), whom he sits next to during the flight. After spending hours together, they become friends and exchange contact details. However, by coincidence, Deepika is travelling to Melbourne to work in the same company as Jhansi, who is settled there. Together they seem to conveniently bump into Karthik at every corner, prompting an unwelcome reunion for Jhansi and Karthik.

While Deepika takes a liking to Karthik, Jhansi ignores him, even though he has hopes of getting back together. At a restaurant, Karthik bumps into a fellow Tamilian named Vaidyanathan (Srinath) and explains his love for Jhansi. The story then flashes back two years. Karthik had met Jhansi at a festival in a temple, where she played a prank on him and his friends. Taking a liking to Jhansi, Karthik begins to follow her intentionally, hoping for her to fall in love with him. Soon after, she becomes more and more suspicious of Karthik. This comes to a head when Karthik acts as the boyfriend of Raju's girlfriend Pooja (Paloma Rao), only for Jhansi to get confused and mistake him. His reputation as a trusting boyfriend takes another turn for the worse, when at a wedding, the bride (Lekha Washington) gives him a kiss after he improvises a song.

As the pair have a love-hate relationship, the breakup beckons when Jhansi sends her friend (Vasundhara Kashyap) undercover to flirt with Karthik. However, he lies by claiming that he was at home ill, prompting Jhansi to end their relationship. At the end of the flashback, Vaidyanathan suggests to Karthik that it is more important to move on than think regretfully, and Karthik gets over his relationship with Jhansi. However, finding out about Deepika's love towards Karthik, Jhansi becomes jealous and reinstates her love for Karthik. Soon, as she sees Deepika and Karthik's compatibility and understanding her fault, she finally understands what went wrong in their relationship. Then, Karthik tells her through a meaningful conversation that he still loves her, not Deepika. After this, Jhansi runs away to Sydney surreptitiously.

At the end of the film, the male interviewer who appeared at the start questions Jhansi on her decision to leave anonymously; however, she refuses to answer at first. Later, she replies that though she still loves Karthik, she was unable to understand him well. She knew that it would not work out and that she did not want to hurt Karthik further, thus becoming the sole reason for her departure. She then confirms that she met up with Deepika recently, and had found that she is married to Karthik and they have a child. She then walks away, claiming that her future lies in her own hands, and she is happy the way she is now.

Cast 
The cast from the film was minimal, mainly focused on the three lead actors.

 Vinay as Karthik, a fun-loving young man, who, despite being a civil engineer, keeps his main intentions of attracting women. The child in his heart is released when he gets to know Jhansi.
 Sadha as Jhansi, a very reserved, hypocritical and caring young woman who expects Karthik to stay loyal to her. Her dominant vivacity presents Karthik, no hope but to leave her.
 Tanisha as Deepika, a bubbly, happy-go lucky young girl, who likes the antics of Karthik unlike Jhansi, prompting her to fall in love with him.
 Srinath as Vaidyanathan, who meets Karthik in Melbourne and becomes an advisor to him.
 Raju Sundaram as Raju, an energetic friend to Karthik with a severe habit of ruining the situation.
 Sathish Krishnan as Sathish, a silent friend to Karthik who attempts to reconcile the relationship.
 Paloma Rao as Priya, Raju's girlfriend.
 Lekha Washington in a cameo role, as a bride at a wedding attended by her friends of Karthik, Raju and Sathish together with Jhansi joining them as Karthik's girlfriend.
 Aravind Akash in a cameo role, as a male interviewer, alongside a female interviewer. They give a brief introduction on the movie.
 Uma in a cameo role, as Karthik's sister.
 Vasundhara Kashyap in cameo role, as a friend of Jhansi whom Karthik meets at the theater on his birthday.

Production

The key elements 
The entire production of the film took about a year and a half to be completed and released. Prior to Unnale Unnale, Jeeva had directed three films, 12B, Ullam Ketkumae and Run, a Hindi film. Unnale Unnale became his last finished film prior to his death on the sets of his next film, Dhaam Dhoom.

The film was originally announced under the title of July Kaatril (In the Winds of July) with a scheduled casting of Arya, Sonia Agarwal and Parvati Melton. However all three of the proposed lead cast opted out of the film. Agarwal cited that her marriage was on the cards and she would find it difficult to sign on for a year, whilst the other two were unable to star in the film due to undisclosed reasons.

In an interview, Jeeva said, "Romance always finds a special place in Tamil films. My new film July Kaatril is also about love", confirming it was a romantic flick.  While Harris Jayaraj was signed on as the music director with Kavignar Vaali and Pa. Vijay assisting him with the lyrics, Jeeva's wife, Aneez, debuted as a costume designer.

Casting, location and music 

The casting of Vinay, after Arya opted out, as Karthik was due to some similarities with the character. Vinay made his debut into the film industry after modelling and featuring in a couple of Tulu advertisements. However, they finalised the choice of the actor only after the script was ready. The choice of Sadha was more difficult and since Anniyan she had received many negative reviews and the film became important to rekindle her success. The role of Deepika went to Tanisha Mukherjee, who despite being a leading heroine's sister (Kajol), she was yet to maintain a hit film. Mukherjee, came down to South India to look for new opportunities and attracted the producer into signing her on. She immediately expressed her satisfaction with the character and consented for the role. The camaraderie that the lead actors shared during the filming, added on to their good performances. Raju Sundaram and Sathish were picked for their dancing skills while actresses Paloma Rao, Lekha Washington, Aravind Akash and Vasundra all played floating cameos in the film.

The film was mostly shot in Melbourne, Australia overlooking the Melbourne Docklands. The climax was shot in Sydney while the beginning and the flashback was picturized in various cities across South India. For the film's music and soundtrack, Jeeva renewed his previous association (12B and Ullam Ketkumae) with Harris Jayaraj. Playback singer, Chinmayi dubbed for Tanisha Mukherjee.

Soundtrack 

The film has six songs composed by Harris Jayaraj with the lyrics primarily penned by Vaali and Pa. Vijay. The audio of the film released nationwide on 24 January 2007, three months prior to the movie release. Sify gave a positive rating stating "Full marks to Harris Jeyaraj for the songs especially the “Unnale Unnale...”, “June Pona...” and the background score which stays long after you leave the hall. They are picturised aesthetically in never-seen-before locations with utmost care going into details. " The soundtrack was highly acclaimed and won the "Youthful Album of the Year" award at "Tamil Music Awards". Harris Jayaraj was also nominated for the Filmfare Award for Best Music Director and the Vijay Award for Best Music Director.

Release

Reception 
The movie was released worldwide alongside Mayakannadi, Madurai Veeran and Arputha Theevu on Tamil New Year's Day, 14 April 2007. Owing to the success of the film, the number of reels grew to about hundred. The film completed 100 days of screening in the theaters in the state of Tamil Nadu. The reception in Malaysia was equally successful and was released in six major metropolises for up to 9 weeks, the film collected $114,883 (then approximately 5 million) within its 50-day run.

Along with its relative commercial success, the film received positive reviews on the storyline and the performances of the actors themselves. Rediff.com praised Sadha's, Tanisha's, and Vinay's performances. The film made business for Vinay, who signed up many films after the project.

Home media 
The DVD version of the film was released on 8 August 2007 in the United Kingdom. This DVD release was distributed by Ayngaran International all around the world. It is available in 16:9 Anamorphic widescreen, Dolby Digital 5.1 Surround, progressive 24 FPS, widescreen and NTSC format. The satellite rights of the film were bagged by Jaya TV.

Legacy 
The original title of this film, July Kaatril, inspired a film of the same name.

References

External links 
 

2007 films
Films directed by Jeeva
Films shot in Sydney
Films shot in Melbourne
2007 romantic drama films
Indian romantic drama films
2000s Tamil-language films
Films scored by Harris Jayaraj